The Mindanao hairy-tailed rat (Batomys salomonseni) is one of five species of rodent in the genus Batomys. It is in the diverse family Muridae. This species is found only  in the Philippines.

References

Rats of Asia
Batomys
Endemic fauna of the Philippines
Rodents of the Philippines
Fauna of Mindanao
Mammals described in 1953
Taxonomy articles created by Polbot
Taxa named by Colin Campbell Sanborn